Floating Islands is the third album by Danish jazz saxophonist Lotte Anker with her trio with pianist Craig Taborn and drummer Gerald Cleaver, which was recorded live at the 2008 Copenhagen Jazz Festival and released on the Danish ILK label.

Reception

In his review for AllMusic, Michael G. Nastos states "This trio has grasped something uniquely subtle and admirably less than the sum of its parts. Not at all a critique, but in a way, admirable that three musicians can reduce their music to smaller pieces in order to expand their horizons."

Track listing
All compositions by Anker/Taborn/Cleaver
 "Floating" – 9:34
 "Ritual" – 16:22
 "Transitory Blossom" – 4:50
 "Backwards River" – 17:52
 "Even Today I'm Still Arriving" – 5:46

Personnel
Lotte Anker – soprano sax, alto sax, tenor sax,
Craig Taborn – piano
Gerald Cleaver - drums

References

2009 live albums
Lotte Anker live albums